Adventures With Rebbe Mendel is a series of children's books written by Nathan Sternfeld and published by Feldheim Publishers. The books belong to the Jewish children's fiction genre. The books were originally written in Hebrew. The English translations were done by Riva Pomerantz.

Books in the series
Adventures With Rebbe Mendel (2002) – a collection of 32 short stories
 All About Motti and His Adventures With Rebbe Mendel (2004) – a book of excerpts from the diary of an imaginative French child named Charles Mordechai Willamson.
The Secret of the Red Pearl (2005)
A Home on the Hill (2006)
Rebbe Mendel ... in a Class by Himself (2009) – a collection of 17 short stories
Rebbe Mendel ... Snow Joke (2018)

See also

Children's literature

References
    

Series of children's books
American children's books
Children's fiction books
Jewish American literature
Children's short story collections
2000s children's books
Hebrew-language books